Poly [ADP-ribose] polymerase 12 is an enzyme that in humans is encoded by the PARP12 gene.

References

Further reading